Prouzel is a commune in the Somme department in Hauts-de-France in northern France.

Geography
Prouzel is situated on the D8b road, some 7 miles (11 km) southwest of Amiens, near the banks of the river Selle.

Population

Places of interest
 sixteenth-century church of Notre-Dame de la Nativité, with baptismal fonts from the twelfth century
 17th-century château
 The ‘Coulée verte’  (en: ’Green Trail’). When the local railway closed in 1939, the derelict line was eventually converted into a pleasant nature trail.
 18th-century pigeon house

Personalities
Gabriel Ferez, a student from Prouzel, was murdered in south London in June 2008.

See also
Communes of the Somme department

References

Communes of Somme (department)